Peter Ellstrom Deuel (February 24, 1940 – December 31, 1971), known professionally as Pete Duel, was an American stage, television, and film actor, best known for his starring role as outlaw Hannibal Heyes (alias Joshua Smith) in the television series Alias Smith and Jones.

Early life
Duel was born in Rochester, New York, the eldest of three children born to Dr. Ellsworth and Lillian Deuel (née Ellstrom). His brother Geoffrey Deuel was also an actor, best known for his role in Chisum (1970) and numerous episodic television appearances of the 1960s and 1970s; their sister's name was Pamela.

He attended Penfield High School, where he worked on the yearbook staff, campaigned for student government, and was a member of the National Thespians Society. He graduated in 1957 and attended St. Lawrence University in Canton, New York, where he majored in English. He was a member of Phi Sigma Kappa fraternity. He preferred performing in the drama department's productions to studying for his classes during his two years there. When his father came to see him in The Rose Tattoo, he realized that his son was only wasting time and money at the university, and told him to follow a career in acting.

Moving to New York City, Duel landed a role in a touring production of the comedy Take Her, She's Mine. To find work in the movies, Duel and his mother drove across the country to Hollywood, California, in 1963, with only a tent to house them each night.

Career
In Hollywood, he found work in television, making small guest appearances in comedies such as Gomer Pyle, U.S.M.C. and dramas such as Channing, Combat!, and  Bonanza. In 1965, he was cast in the comedy series Gidget as Gidget's brother-in-law, John Cooper; he appeared in 22 of the show's 32 episodes.

After Gidgets cancellation, Duel was quickly offered the starring role of Dave Willis, a newlywed apprentice architect, in the romantic comedy series Love on a Rooftop. Although the show earned good ratings, ABC decided not to bring it back after its first season. Duel wished to move from sitcoms to more serious roles. Around 1970, he changed the spelling of his last name from Deuel to Duel.

Duel appeared in The Psychiatrist, The Bold Ones, Ironside, and Marcus Welby, M.D.; he also made feature films during this time, beginning with The Hell with Heroes in 1968, playing Rod Taylor’s best friend and co-pilot, Mike Brewer, followed the next year by Generation. After that film, he went to Spain to make Cannon for Cordoba (1970), a Western in which he played the mischievous soldier Andy Rice.

In 1970, Duel was cast as the outlaw Hannibal Heyes, alias Joshua Smith, opposite Ben Murphy's Kid Curry, in Alias Smith and Jones, a light-hearted Western about the exploits of two outlaws trying to earn their amnesty. During the hiatus between the first and second seasons, he starred in the television production of Percy MacKaye’s 1908 play The Scarecrow.

According to Quentin Tarantino, Duel was one of the inspirations for the character of Rick Dalton in the film Once Upon a Time in Hollywood. In Tarantino's novelization of the movie, Duel and Dalton worked together, "enjoyed... each other's company" and were both "undiagnosed bipolar."

Personal life
Duel became involved in politics during the primaries for the 1968 presidential election, campaigning for Eugene McCarthy, in opposition to the Vietnam War. He attended the 1968 Democratic National Convention in Chicago, and witnessed the violence that erupted.

Death
In the early hours of Friday, New Years Eve 1971, Duel died at his Hollywood Hills home of a self-inflicted gunshot wound to the head.

Duel's girlfriend Dianne Ray was at his home at the time of his death and discovered his body. Ray later told police the couple had watched Duel's series Alias Smith and Jones the previous evening. She later went to sleep in another room while Duel stayed up. Sometime after midnight, Duel entered the bedroom, retrieved his revolver and told Ray "I'll see you later." Ray then said she heard a gunshot from another room and discovered Duel's body.

According to police, Duel's friends and family said he was depressed about his drinking problem. He had been arrested and pleaded guilty to a driving under the influence accident that injured two people the previous June. Duel's death was later ruled a suicide.

Duel's funeral was held at the Self-Realization Fellowship Temple on January 2, 1972, in Pacific Palisades. At the service, his girlfriend Dianne Ray read a poem he wrote, titled "Love". An estimated 1,000 friends and fans attended. His body was flown to Penfield, New York, where he was buried in Oakwood Cemetery.

After his death, his role in Alias Smith and Jones was taken over by Roger Davis, who was previously the narrator over the opening theme of the show. The loss of Duel proved too great for the series to sustain and it 
was canceled in early 1973.

Filmography

Notes

Sources

External links

 Pete Duel Memorial Site (approved by Pete Duel's family)
 
 Article on "Pete Duel — A Biography"
 

1940 births
1971 deaths
20th-century American male actors
American male film actors
American male stage actors
American male television actors
Male actors from Rochester, New York
St. Lawrence University alumni
Suicides by firearm in California
California Democrats
New York (state) Democrats
1971 suicides